Claire Buchar  (born 26 April 1978, in Whistler, Canada), also known as Claire Kovarik, is a professional racing cyclist specialising in downhill mountain biking.  Buchar races on the UCI World Cup circuit and is a multiple Canadian national champion in her profession and is a multiple World Cup medalist.

Buchar started competitive cycling when she was 20 years old and placed 2nd in her first National race.

Buchar has been a member of the Chain Reaction Cycles/Intense Cycles' MTB Race team since 2009. She has been a member of the Canadian National Downhill team since 2000 and studies graphic design part-time when she's not racing.  She finished in 6th place  in the 2009 National Championships in Canberra, Australia and more recently finished in first place in the Australian National Downhill Championships.

In 2008 Buchar married teammate and fellow downhill mountain Bike rider, Australian Chris Kovarik.

Career highlights

Media and accomplishments
 Canadian National Team member
 World Cup Podium, round 1 South Africa 2009 
 Top 10 World Cup racer 
 Canadian National Champion 2009 
 Winner of Womenzworx and the Gala at Crankworx 2009 
 Nominated for International Cyclist of the Year 2009
 Cover of Bicycling South Africa April 2009
 Voted one of the "26 Most Influential People in Mountain Biking", Decline Magazine January 2008
 Cover of Mountain Bike Magazine USA June 2008

Racing & competition
   2009 Canadian National Champion
   2009 World Cup Series, 9th Overall
   2009 World Cup Peitermaritzburg South Africa 5th
   2009 World Cup Ft Bill Scotland 8th
   2009 World Cup Maribor Slovenia 10th
   2009 World Cup Bromont Quebec 7th
   2009 World Cup Finals Scladming Austria 8th
   2009 World Championships Canberra Australia 6th
 2009 Sprint Avalanche Cup Alp Duez France 2nd
 2009 Megavalanche Alp Duez France 9th
 2009 Wheels of Speed Willingen Germany 1st
 2009 Womenzworx freeride comp Whistler Canada 1st
 2009 The Gala slopestyle comp Whistler Canada 1st
   2008 World Cup Series, 8th Overall
   2008 World Cup MSA Canada 6th
   2008 World Cup Bromont Canada 6th
   2008 World Cup Finals Schladming Austria 9th
 2008 the Gala, all women's freeride event at Crankworx 3rd 
 2007 the Gala, all women's freeride event at Crankworx 1st
   2006 World Cup Vigo Spain 10th
 2006, 2007, 2008 -3 time winner- RedBull Mt Seven Psychosis, Golden Canada

References

External links
 Canadian DH Girls

1978 births
Living people
Canadian female cyclists
Sportspeople from British Columbia